Tyomkinsky District is an administrative and municipal district (raion), one of the twenty-five in Smolensk Oblast, Russia. It is located in the northeast of the oblast. Its administrative center is the rural locality (a selo) of Tyomkino. Population: 6,348 (2010 Census);  The population of the administrative center accounts for 38.0% of the district's total population.

References

Notes

Sources

Districts of Smolensk Oblast